The Minister of Labor (Sar HaAvoda) was the political head of the Israeli Ministry of Labor and a position in the cabinet.

History
The post was established in 1948 as the Minister of Labour and Construction, becoming the Minister of Labour and Social Security the following year.

In 1977 the post was merged with the Welfare Minister, becoming the Minister of Labor and Social Welfare. In 2003 the labor function was transferred to the Minister of Industry and Trade, which was renamed Industry, Trade and Labor Minister.

List ministers

References

External links
All Ministers in the Ministry of Labor and Social Welfare Knesset website

Government ministries of Israel
Lists of government ministers of Israel